Arthur Young (2 September 1898 – 24 February 1959) was an English actor, notable for roles including Gladstone in the 1951 The Lady with a Lamp. He can be seen as a window cleaner in the film Radio Parade of 1935. He regularly appeared in BBC radio plays and was a member of the Corporation’s Drama Repertory Company in the late 1950s. His stage work encompassed West End revue, as well as Stratford.

Personal life
Young was born on 2 September 1898 in Bristol. His parents were Henry Young and Elizabeth Wales Young (1876-1972).

Filmography

References

External links

English male stage actors
English male film actors
Male actors from Bristol
1959 deaths
1898 births
20th-century English male actors
English male radio actors